Eddie Hanley (20 May 1900 – 5 May 1969) was an Australian rules footballer who played with Richmond in the Victorian Football League (VFL).

Notes

External links 

1900 births
1969 deaths
Australian rules footballers from Victoria (Australia)
Richmond Football Club players
Numurkah Football Club players